Jogidaha (ward no. 1 of Triyuga municipality) is a populated place located in Triyuga municipality of Udayapur District in Province No. 1 of Nepal. At the time of 2011 Nepal census it had a population of 6,665 people living in 1,451 individual households.

Previously, Jogidaha was a separate village development committee in Udayapur District of Sagarmatha Zone in Eastern Region. At the time of the 1991 Nepal census it had a population of 4698 people living in 872 individual households.

Fulfilling the requirement of the new Constitution of Nepal 2015, MoFALD replaced all old VDCs and Municipalities into 753 new local level body (Municipality), thus Jogidah was merged with Triyuga Municipality. Jogidah was arranged into two wards of Triyuga municipality, some part carved out from Jogidah and merged with ward no. 2 (Motiyahi) so total area of Jogidah (Ward no. 1) remained 46.5 KM² and total population was 4059.

Administration

See also
Saune
Khanbu
Jalpachilaune

References

External links
UN map of the municipalities of Udayapur District

Populated places in Udayapur District
Triyuga Municipality
Wards and electoral divisions of Nepal